William Moore, and variations of William such as Will, Willie, Bill or Billy Moore, may refer to:

Artists and entertainers
Billy Moore (musician, born 1917) (1917–1989), American jazz musician
Billy Moore (musician, born 1931) (1931–2002), Guyana caribbean musician
 Wild Bill Moore (1918–1983), tenor saxophone player Expos
 William Moore (critic) (1868–1937), Australian art critic and author
 William Moore (musician) (1893–1951), U.S. blues singer and guitarist
 William Moore (actor) (1916–2000), British TV actor
 William Moore (dancer) (1933–1992),  African American dance critic, dancer, researcher, managed the Eleo Pomare Dance Company at one time
 William Henry Moore (1872–1960), Canadian author and Member of the Canadian House of Commons
 William R. Moore (journalist) (1909/10–1950), war correspondent killed in the Korean War
 Willie "Pdub" Moore Jr., actor and comedian

Businesspeople
 William Moore (banker) (1914–2009), chairman of the board, Bankers Trust
 William Dalgety Moore (1835–1910), Western Australian businessman
 William H. Moore, soldier, businessman and founder of the Mystic Copper Mine and Elizabethtown, New Mexico
 William H. H. Moore (1824–1910), American lawyer and insurance executive

Military people
 William Moore (Medal of Honor) (1837–1918), American Civil War sailor and Medal of Honor recipient
 William Moore (British Army officer) (born 1958), British general
 William Moore (loyalist) (1949–2009), Northern Irish loyalist paramilitary and Shankill Butcher
 William G. Moore Jr. (1920–2012), U.S. Air Force general
 Sir William George Moore (British Army officer) (1795–1862)

Politicians and judges
 Bill Moore (Queensland politician) (1897–1976), member of the Queensland Legislative Assembly for Merthyr from 1940–1957
 William Moore (Ardee MP) (c. 1685–1732), Member of the Parliament of Ireland for Ardee 1715–27
 William Moore (Clogher MP) (1743–1810), Member of the Parliament of Ireland for Clogher, Clonmel and St Johnstown
 Sir William Moore, 1st Baronet (1864–1944), Irish politician and judge
 Sir William Moore, 2nd Baronet, Anglo-Irish politician
 William Robert Moore (1830–1909), American politician, U.S. Representative from Tennessee
 William S. Moore (1822–1877), American lawyer and politician, U.S. Congressman from Pennsylvania
 William J. Moore (1923–2015), American politician, Pennsylvania State Senator 1973–1988
 Henson Moore (William Henson Moore III, born 1939), American lawyer and politician, U.S. Representative from Louisiana
 William Moore (Banbury MP) (1699–1746), British politician, Member of Parliament for Banbury
 William Moore (1699–1783), United States landowner, politician and jurist; builder of Moore Hall
 William Moore (Pennsylvania politician, died 1793) (1735–1793), jurist and politician, President (i.e. Governor) of Pennsylvania
 William Moore (New Jersey politician) (1810–1878), American politician, U.S. Representative from New Jersey
 William Campbell Moore (1923–1982), politician in British Columbia, Canada
 William Henry Moore (judge) (1848–1923), among founders, U.S. Steel, corporate director
 William L. Moore (Virginia politician) (1851–1926), American politician, member of the Virginia House of Delegates
 William O. Moore (1841–1913), American politician in the Virginia House of Delegates
 William Theodore Moore Jr. (born 1940), American lawyer, U.S. federal judge
 William T. Moore (Texas politician) (1918–1999), American politician, President pro tempore of the 55th Texas legislature
 William Moore (Wisconsin politician) (1886–1961), Wisconsin State Assemblyman
 William Henry Moore (Australian solicitor) (1788–1854), English-Australian solicitor
 William Moore (Australian politician) (1823–1914), Australian politician
 William Moore (Queensland politician) (1866–1933), member of the Queensland Legislative Assembly for Murilla
 William Sturge Moore (died 1809), political figure in Lower Canada
 William Vail Moore (1818–?), Wisconsin State Assemblyman
 William W. Moore (c. 1832–?), Florida Representative
 William Hickman Moore (1861–1946), American politician in Seattle, Washington
 W. F. Moore (William Folsom Moore, 1868–1956), Justice of the Supreme Court of Texas

Sportspeople

Football
 Bill Moore (American football) (1912–1973), American football player
 Bill Moore (Australian footballer) (1917–2009), Australian rules footballer
 Bill Moore (footballer, born 1913) (1913–1982), English football player and manager
 Bill Moore (rugby union) (1921–2002), English rugby union player
Billy Moore (footballer, born 1894) (1894–1968), English footballer
Billy Moore (footballer, born 1912) (1912–2002), Welsh footballer
Billy Moore (rugby) (1910–1976), Welsh dual-code rugby player
Billy Moore (rugby league) (born 1971), Australian rugby league footballer
 Will Moore (gridiron football) (born 1970), American and Canadian football wide receiver
 William Moore (American football) (born 1985), American football safety
 William Moore (footballer) (1895–1932), Ireland international footballer
 William M. Moore (1926–2013), American football and basketball coach
 William R. Moore (American football) (1922–2011), American football coach

Other sports
 Bill Moore (catcher) (1901–1972), MLB catcher for the 1926–27 Boston Red Sox
 Bill Moore (first baseman) (born 1960), MLB first baseman for the 1986 Montreal
 Bill Moore (pitcher) (1902–1984), MLB pitcher for the 1925 Detroit Tigers
 Bill Moore (cricketer) (1863–1956), Australian cricketer
Billy Moore (boxer), English retired Muay Thai boxer
 Wilcy Moore (1897–1963), American baseball player
 William Moore (athlete) (1890–1956), British track and field athlete
 William Moore (cyclist) (born 1947), British Olympic cyclist
 William Moore (cricketer, born 1846) (1846–1919), English cricketer
 William Moore (bowls), Scottish lawn bowler
 William T. Moore (yachtsman), American yachtsman and president of Moore-McCormack, son of founder Albert V. Moore
 Willie Moore (Collegians hurler), Irish hurler and Gaelic footballer
 Willie Moore (Cork hurler) (1931–2003), Irish hurler for Cork
 Willie Moore (Limerick hurler) (born 1950), Irish hurler for Limerick

Other people
 Bill Moore (ufologist) (born 1943?), author and former UFO researcher
 Bill Moore, founder of the audio streaming service TuneIn
 Will H. Moore (1962–2017), American political scientist
 William Moore (mathematician) (fl. c. 1806–1823), British mathematician and early contributor to rocket theory
 William Moore (steamship captain) (1822–1909), British Columbia gold rush entrepreneur, miner, explorer and earliest settler of Skagway, Alaska
 William Harrison Moore (1867–1935), Australian lawyer and academic
 William Lewis Moore (1927–1963), American postal worker and Congress of Racial Equality (CORE) member
 William Moore (bishop) (1858–1930), Anglican bishop of Kilmore, Elphin and Ardagh
 William Underhill Moore (1879–1949), American law professor
 William Moore (surveyor) (1827–1897), Los Angeles County, California
 William Usborne Moore (1849–1918), British naval commander, psychical researcher and spiritualist
 William C. Moore (born 1929), United States Army general
 Willie Hobbs Moore (1934–1994), first African-American woman to earn a PhD in physics
 Willie Moretti, also known as Willie Moore, underboss of the Genovese crime family
 William Moore (chemist) (1941–2020), American chemist

See also
Billie Moore (1943–2022), American basketball coach
 William More (disambiguation)